Yin Chengzong (Hokkien: Un Seng Chong) (born 1941 in Gulangyu Island, Xiamen, Fujian) is a Chinese pianist and composer.

Biography
Born on the "Piano Island" of Gulangyu Island in Xiamen, Fujian, in the People's Republic of China. Although trained as a classical pianist, he is perhaps best known to the West through the Yellow River Piano Concerto he arranged based on the Yellow River Cantata and performed in many Western theaters since the 1980s.

Yin started learning the piano in 1948 when he was seven years old, and gave his first recital at the age of nine. At twelve, he joined the preparatory school of Shanghai Conservatory of Music. In 1959, Yin won an award at the World Youth Peace and Friendship Festival in Vienna, Austria, and in 1960, he was sent to the Leningrad Conservatory to study. In 1962, he and  American pianist Susan Starr were the second-prize winners of the International Tchaikovsky Competition (Vladimir Ashkenazy shared the first-prize with British pianist John Odgon). In 1965, Yin joined the Central Symphony Orchestra of China as a soloist.

Cultural Revolution
In 1973, during the Cultural Revolution, Yin joined the Communist Party of China, and, four years earlier in 1969, at the suggestion of Jiang Qing, changed his name to Yin Chengzhong (殷诚忠), as his original given name, Chengzong (承宗, literally "carrying on the ancestral legacy"), was considered unsuitable due to its supposed association with the perpetuation of the traditions of the exploiting class; his new given name, Chengzhong (诚忠), carried the literal meaning of "sincere and loyal." (After relocating to the United States in 1983, however, he reverted to his original name.) At a time when virtually all Western art forms were forbidden, Yin passionately and ingeniously found an application of his talent: he created the piano-accompanied version of The Legend of the Red Lantern, one of the Eight model plays, the only plays, operas and ballets which were permitted during the period. Although, musically speaking, there was not much originality in the work, it was refreshing for genuine music lovers who were longing to have access to Western music. Another creation attributed to Yin is the now well-known Yellow River Piano Concerto. Yin and other members of a special committee arranged this work in 1969 based on the Yellow River Cantata by Xian Xinghai. In the final movement of the concerto, Yin incorporated the melody The East Is Red. The instruments used, the piano and the orchestra, were all Western, but the music was heavily influenced by Chinese folk melodies.

United States
In 1983, following difficulties with the new post-Mao Chinese Communist Party due to his alleged closeness to the Gang of Four, Yin emigrated to the US, and in the same year, he made his debut in Carnegie Hall in New York City. Yin has since performed under the baton of Eugene Ormandy and the Philadelphia Orchestra, Claudio Abbado and the Vienna Philharmonic Orchestra, Kirill Kondrashin and the Moscow Philharmonic Orchestra, and Sir Malcolm Sargent and the St. Petersburg Philharmonic Orchestra. Yin has also appeared in Boston, San Francisco, Chicago, Toronto, and at Lincoln Center. His solo performances were featured on China Central Television and CBS Sunday Morning. Formerly a professor and artist-in-residence at the Cleveland Institute of Music, Mr. Yin now lives in New York City.

Yin has released more than 20 albums, including an all-Chopin CD, a recording of Debussy's Preludes, and the Yellow River Concerto.

References

External links
Yin Chengzong Official site

1941 births
Living people
Chinese classical pianists
Cleveland Institute of Music faculty
People from Xiamen
People of the Cultural Revolution
Musicians from Fujian
Musicians from New York City